ADA University (ADA) is a university established under the Ministry of Foreign Affairs of Azerbaijan in March 2006 by Hafiz Pashayev. By the decree of President, ADA was transformed into university in 2014. When founded as the Azerbaijan Diplomatic Academy the main objective was to train specialists for a diplomatic career in Azerbaijani foreign affairs, however its programs expanded and the name changed to ADA University. Its founding rector is Ambassador Hafiz Pashayev, who is a Deputy Foreign Minister of Azerbaijan and a former ambassador of Azerbaijan to the United States. Its present, dedicated campus opened in September 2012.

Schools and programs 
Since 2006, ADA has expanded the number of programs it offers and became a full-fledged university with four schools.

School of Public and International Affairs (BA in International Relations; BA in Public Affairs; MA in Diplomacy and International Affairs; Master in Public Administration; Law)

School of Business (BA in Business Administration; BS in Economics; Master of Business Administration)

School of Education (MA in Educational Management; EAPP)

School of Information Technologies and Engineering (BS in Computer Science; BS in Computer Engineering; BS in Information Technologies; MS in Computer Science and Data Analytics)

Financial Aid

Fellowship 
ADA offers a limited number of full and partial fellowships to outstanding international students studying in its degree programs.

Student employment 
Students have part-time employment opportunities at ADA. These opportunities are announced internally based on
departments needs and the available budget. Students are also eligible for a Research Assistantship. Successful candidates are expected to assist ADA faculty member with a research project. ADA University funds a limited number of opportunities for work-study program for those students that experience financial difficulties with their studies.

Scholarships 
ADA offers merit-based scholarships for students’ outstanding academic performance. Newly admitted students are awarded with scholarships based on the result in the State Entrance Examination (SEC). Returning students scoring GPA of 4.0 are granted 100% of waiver off their tuition fee. Students scoring in the top 10% of their program get 50% scholarship. Students scoring in the next top 10% of their program receive 25% scholarship.

Student life

Student clubs 
 ACM Club
 ADA Algorithmics Club
 ADA Outdoorsman Club
 ADAMUN Club
 Adventour Club
AIESEC ADA 
 Arts and Creativity Club
 Book Club
 Charity Club
Drama Club
European Azerbaijan Club
 Grey Club
Oikos Club
Politics Club 
Study Club
Drama Club 
Milli Club
Hyoumanity Club
Intellectual Games Club
 ADA Chess Club
 Law Society

Haji Zeynalabdin Taghiyev Awards 
The Haji Zeynalabdin Taghiyev Awards Ceremony is held each year in May at ADA University. The awards are rewarded to three best student teams with the emphasis on social responsibility. The award promotes values such as civic engagement and social responsibility.

International Students 
ADA University are represented with the international students and faculty from more than 40 countries including the countries in Asia, Europe, Americas and Africa. International students have the International country days, so-called Country Profile Days where they represent their country to the locals and other international students. ADA University annually holds International Festival where the members of international community come together in a large student fair and try their cuisines.

Career Management Center 
Career Management Center (CMC) supports the professional development of ADA University students with industry-related and hands-on skill set by offering diverse internship and employment opportunities in the competitive job market. The exceptional contributions of CMC staff members toward reinforcing the students as tomorrow’s professionals earn international recognition.

In July 2017, the CCEE (Caspian Center for Energy and Environment) of ADA University arranged Baku Summer Energy School (BSES). The two-week certificate program brought together world-renowned scholars, academicians, and policymakers to examine and better understand global energy and environment issues and their practical application.

References

Universities in Baku
Educational institutions established in 2006
2006 establishments in Azerbaijan